The Annexet is one of the venues in Stockholm Globe City, located in Stockholm, Sweden. The venue opened in 1989 and has a capacity of 3,950 people.

Events
Annexet is mostly used for concerts and ice hockey matches.

All shows of Melodifestivalen 2021 were held in the Annexet. Due to restrictions related to the COVID-19 pandemic, no audience was present.

In 2021 and 2022, the Swedish Sports Awards were held in the Annexet instead of the usual venue, the Globe Arena, also due to COVID-19 restrictions.

See also
 Ericsson Globe
 Stockholm Globe City

References

External links

 Annexet

Indoor arenas in Sweden
Indoor ice hockey venues in Sweden
Ice hockey venues in Sweden
Buildings and structures in Stockholm
1989 establishments in Sweden
Music venues completed in 1989